The 2016 Bendigo Women's International was a professional tennis tournament played on outdoor hard courts. It was the 10th edition of the tournament and part of the 2016 ITF Women's Circuit, offering a total of $50,000 in prize money. It took place in Bendigo, Australia, on 24–30 October 2016.

Singles main draw entrants

Seeds 

 1 Rankings as of 17 October 2016.

Other entrants 
The following player received a wildcard into the singles main draw:
  Monique Adamczak
  Maddison Inglis
  Angelique Svinos

The following players received entry from the qualifying draw:
  Georgia Brescia
  Yuki Kristina Chiang
  Abigail Tere-Apisah
  Marianna Zakarlyuk

The following player received entry by a lucky loser spot:
  Shelby Talcott

Champions

Singles

 Risa Ozaki def.  Asia Muhammad, 6–3, 6–3

Doubles

 Asia Muhammad /  Arina Rodionova def.  Shuko Aoyama /  Risa Ozaki, 6–4, 6–3

External links 
 2016 Bendigo Women's International at ITFtennis.com
 Official website

2016 ITF Women's Circuit
2016 in Australian tennis
Bendigo Women's International
2016 in Australian women's sport